The 1878 Belfast by-election was held on 2 April 1878.  The by-election was held due to the resignation (Inspector of Fisheries in Ireland) of the incumbent Conservative MP, William Johnston.  It was won by the Conservative candidate William Ewart.

References

1878 elections in the United Kingdom
By-elections to the Parliament of the United Kingdom in Belfast (pre partition)
19th century in Belfast
1878 elections in Ireland